Jing Haipeng (born 24 October 1966) is a major general of the People's Liberation Army Ground Force (PLAGF) in active service as a vice-commander of the 82nd Group Army. A fighter pilot in the PLA Air Force (PLAAF), he was selected to be a PLA Astronaut Corps (PLAAC) astronaut in 1998. He is the first Chinese astronaut to have flown on three missions (Shenzhou 7, Shenzhou 9 and Shenzhou 11).

Career 
Jing was one of the six trainees for the Shenzhou 6 mission.

Jing, along with Liu Boming and Zhai Zhigang were selected for the prime crew on Shenzhou 7 on 17 September 2008. On 25 September 2008, at 21:10 CST, they launched into space as the first three-man crew for China aboard China's third human spaceflight mission.

Jing was selected as commander of Shenzhou 9, becoming the first repeat traveller of the Chinese program. He commanded  the first manned mission to dock with the first Chinese space station, Tiangong 1, with the first female astronaut, Liu Yang. The third member of his crew was Liu Wang. The mission was launched on 16 June 2012, returning to Earth on 29 June 2012.

On 15 October 2016, a press release indicated Jing Haipeng would be the commander of the Shenzhou 11 mission, that was slated for departure only two days later. The Shenzhou 11 launched at 07:30 on 17 October 2016 local time (23:30 UTC on 16 October 2016) from the Jiuquan Satellite Launch Center using a Long March 2F launch vehicle. The crew landed successfully after the 33 day mission on 18 November 2016.The reentry module of the Shenzhou-11 spacecraft landed in Inner Mongolia around 2.15 p.m (China time) after detaching from the space lab on 17 November 2016. After landing, Jing Haipeng held the record for the most cumulative time in space by a Chinese citizen with 47 days until 2021 when Nie Haisheng accumulated 111 days after the Shenzhou 12 mission.

In July 2017, Chairman Xi Jinping awarded Jing the Order of August First, the highest military award of People's Republic of China.

See also 

 List of Chinese astronauts

References

External links 

 Spacefacts biography of Jing Haipeng

1966 births
Living people
Shenzhou 7
Shenzhou program astronauts
People's Liberation Army Astronaut Corps
People's Liberation Army Air Force generals
People's Liberation Army generals from Shanxi